An oil boom is a period of large inflow of income as a result of high global oil prices or large oil production in an economy. Generally, this short period initially brings economic benefits, in terms of increased GDP growth, but might later lead to a resource curse.

History
Some important oil booms around the world include:
 Mexican oil boom (Mexico, 1977–1981)
 Pennsylvanian oil rush (United States, 1859)
 Texas oil boom (United States, early 1900s–1940s)
 Calgary oil boom (Canada, 1947)
 North Dakota oil boom (United States, 2008–2015)

Consequences
According to the Dutch disease theory, the sudden discovery of oil may cause a decline in the manufacturing sector. The consequences will vary from country to country, depending on the country's economic structure and stage of development. For example, after the oil boom in Gabon, the country showed symptoms of the Dutch disease, while oil-producing Equatorial Guinea didn't.

See also 

 Energy crisis
 1970s energy crisis
 1973 energy crisis
 1979 energy crisis
 1980s oil glut

References